The Strong One is the second studio album by the American country music artist Mila Mason, released in 1998 on Atlantic Records. Like her debut album, it was produced by Blake Mevis.

Her second and final album for the label, it produced two minor chart hits on both the Billboard Hot Country Singles & Tracks (now Hot Country Songs) charts and the Canadian RPM Top Country Tracks charts. The first, "Closer to Heaven", was a #31 in the US and #45 in Canada, while "The Strong One" was a #57 in the US and a #30 in Canada. The third single, "This Heart", failed to chart in either country, and by the end of 1998, Mason had exited Atlantic.

Track listing

Personnel
Mark Casstevens – acoustic guitar
Glen Duncan – fiddle
Sonny Garrish – pedal steel guitar
John Hobbs – piano
David James – background vocals
Carl Marsh – strings
Brent Mason – electric guitar
Jonell Mosser – background vocals
Chris Rodriguez – background vocals
Nan Sumrall – background vocals
Lonnie Wilson – drums
Glenn Worf – bass guitar

Chart performance

References

1998 albums
Atlantic Records albums
Mila Mason albums